Susan G. Himel is a judge in the Ontario Superior Court of Justice for the Toronto region. Previously, she served as the assistant Deputy Attorney General of Ontario.

References

Judges in Ontario
Living people
Year of birth missing (living people)